The Computing and Communications Center is a building of Cornell University, located in Ithaca, New York. It was built in 1911 and listed on the National Register of Historic Places in 1984. It was designed by Green & Wicks.

Originally built by New York State for the Home Economics program, the building was renamed Comstock Hall in 1934 when the Entomology Department relocated there. In the 1980s, it was sold to Cornell so that mainframe computers could be relocated from Langmuir Laboratory. As a result, a new, state-funded Entomology Department building was named Comstock Hall in 1985, and the historic building was given its present name. The building was named in honor of John Henry Comstock and Anna Botsford Comstock.

References

External links
Facilities information page

Cornell University buildings
University and college buildings on the National Register of Historic Places in New York (state)
National Register of Historic Places in Tompkins County, New York
1911 establishments in New York (state)